Jianguo Road may refer to:

 Jianguo Road (Beijing), in the People's Republic of China (China)
 Jianguo Road (Taipei), in Taiwan (Republic of China)
 Jianguo Road (Xi'an), near Jianguomen (Xi'an), China

See also
 Jianguomen Inner Street, Beijing
 Jianguomen Outer Street, Beijing
 Jianguomen (disambiguation)